Liga Asobal is the premier professional handball league in Spain. It was founded in 1958 with the name of División de Honor, changing its name to the current name in 1990.
The Liga ASOBAL, which is played under EHF rules, currently consists of 16 teams, including famous ones like FC Barcelona, Ademar León, Bidasoa and Granollers.

Famous handball players who have played in the league include Jackson Richardson, Talant Dujshebaev, Staffan Olsson, Mikhail Yakimovich, Ólafur Stefánsson, Oleg Kisselev, Alberto Urdiales, Mateo Garralda, Enric Masip, Iñaki Urdangarin, David Barrufet, Kristian Kjelling, Mikkel Hansen, Petar Metličić, Ivano Balić, Juanín García, Mats Olsson, David Davis, László Nagy, Raúl Entrerríos, Alberto Entrerríos, and many others.

History
 The "División de Honor" Handball championship was created in 1958 and was managed by the Spanish Handball Federation (FEBM) until 1990. ASOBAL (Handball Clubs Association) was formed in 1984. In 1990, ASOBAL took control of the División de Honor and renamed it Liga ASOBAL.
FC Barcelona have won every championship since 2011, in part due to the disbandment of previous top clubs Ciudad Real and Portland San Antonio.
The 13-time champions Granollers have not won the title since the 1973–74 season.

Championship rules
Each team of every division has to play with all the other teams of its division twice, once at home and the other at the opponent's stadium. This means that in Liga ASOBAL the league ends after every team plays 30 matches.

Like many other leagues in continental Europe, the Liga ASOBAL takes a winter break once each team has played half its schedule. One unusual feature of the league is that the two halves of the season are played in the same order—that is, the order of each team's first-half fixtures is repeated in the second half of the season, with the only difference being the stadiums used.

Each victory adds 2 points to the team in the league ranking. Each drawn adds 1 point.head-to-head.
At the end of the league, the winner is:
The team that has most points in the ranking.
If two or more teams are level on points, the winner is the team that has the best results
If there is no winner after applying the second rule, then the team with the best overall goal difference wins.

2022-23 season teams

Champions by year

Primera División champions

División de Honor champions

Liga ASOBAL champions

Performance by club

All-time Liga ASOBAL table

Updated at completion of 2017–18 season.

League or status at 2018–19 season:

Statistics

EHF coefficients

The following data indicates Spanish coefficient rankings between European handball leagues.

Country ranking
EHF League Ranking for 2018/19 season:

1.  (1)  Handball-Bundesliga (128.50)
2.  (2)  Liga ASOBAL (115)
3.  (3)  Nemzeti Bajnokság I (106.83)
4.  (4)  LNH Division 1 (105.83)
5.  (5)  Polish Superliga (75.71)

Club ranking
EHF Club Ranking as of 3 March 2019:

 1.  Barcelona (1002)
 25.  Ademar León (346)
 28.  La Rioja (317)
 32.  Granollers (295)
 52.  Anaitasuna (165)

See also

División de Plata de Balonmano
Copa del Rey de Balonmano

References

External links
 Official website
 The ASOBAL Magazine, "balonmano"
 Honours list with link to teams and results

 
1
Professional sports leagues in Spain